Catabiosis is the process of growing older, aging and physical degradation.

The word comes from Greek "kata"—down, against, reverse and "biosis"—way of life and is generally used to describe senescence and degeneration in living organisms and biophysics of aging in general.

One of the popular catabiotic theories is the entropy theory of aging, where aging is characterized by thermodynamically favourable increase in structural disorder. Living organisms are open systems that take free energy from the environment and offload their entropy as waste. However, basic components of living systems—DNA, proteins, lipids and sugars—tend towards the state of maximum entropy while continuously accumulating damages causing catabiosis of the living structure. 

Catabiotic force on the contrary is the influence exerted by living structures on adjoining cells, by which the latter are developed in harmony with the primary structures.

See also 
Onpedia definition of catabiosis
Catabiotic force
Dictionary.com - Catabiosis
DNA damage theory of aging

Medical aspects of death
Biology terminology
Senescence